The 2010 Irish Classic (often known as the 2010 Lucan Racing Irish Classic for sponsorship and promotion purposes) was a professional non-ranking snooker tournament that took place between 24 and 25 July 2010 at the Celbridge Snooker Club in Kildare, Republic of Ireland.

Fergal O'Brien won in the final 5–1 against Michael Judge.

Main draw

References

2010
Irish Classic
Classic